The youth sector is responsible for managing all the teams registered by SSC Napoli into their youth leagues that is governed by the Italian FIGC for various National and International tournaments. The objective of this policy is to train and enhance young members of SSC Napoli so that they can be launched in the world of professional football, creating a pool of talent from which the first team can draw on.a player  and want a chance  in  your team

Squads
The Youth Sector, according to the Italian football league system, is divided into six squads: 'Primavera', 'Berretti', 'Allievi Nazionali', 'Giovanissimi', 'Esordienti' and 'Pulcini'.

In the 1962-1963 season the FIGC decided to create a national youth championship called the Campionato Primavera. In which the Naples has participated in since the first edition with mixed success. In the early sixties a young youth star was born in the median of Antonio Juliano , who would soon debut in the first team and become the second most capped player to ever play for Napoli with 505 appearances in the league and cup alone. Since then, several future international players have emerged, including the likes of Fabio Cannavaro and Lorenzo Insigne.

'Primavera' Squad
Società Sportiva Calcio Napoli Primavera is the Napoli football team composed of footballers between 15 and 20 years old. According to Italian Football’s hierarchy, it is the main youth category and is thus above the 'Berretti' squad. Each season, the 'Primavera' squad is the experimental group for the trial and/or promotion of the future members of the first team before the beginning of the Serie A season. Players deemed ready for first team football are registered and given a first team squad number. The team currently competes in group C of the Primavera TIM Championship.They have won the Primavera TIM Championship better known as Campionato Nazionale Primavera once in the 1978–79 Primavera season.

They also participate in the Coppa Italia Primavera and have been Champions once in 1997 they also compete in the annual Torneo di Viareggio  one of the most prestigious U-20 championships in the world, an international tournament they have won and been runners-up 4 times.

The Primavera team also took part in the very first UEFA U-19 Champions League now called The UEFA Youth League after the Napoli first team qualified for the Champions League which gave the Primavera team access into the UEFA U-19 Champions League tournament, Napoli was put into Group F of the tournament with Olympique de Marseille, Arsenal F.C. and
Borussia Dortmund. Napoli beat all the teams in the group, Olympique de Marseille, Arsenal F.C. and
Borussia Dortmund at home to progress to the last 16 which saw them draw Real Madrid which they lost 2-1 in stoppage time with a goal by Aleix Febas Pérez in the 93rd minute.

Primavera squad

Primavera Staff
Head coach:  Nicolò Frustalupi

Managerial history
  Mario Corso(1978-1982)
  Luigi Caffarelli(1997-2007)
  Raimondo Marino(2003-2004)
  Roberto Miggiano(2010-2011)
  Adolfo Sormani(2011-2012)
  Giampaolo Saurini (2012–2017)
  Loris Beoni (2017 - 2018)
  Roberto Baronio (2018 - 2020)
  Giuseppe Angelini (2020)
  Emmanuel Cascione (2020 - 2021)
  Nicolò Frustalupi (2021–present)

Honours
Scudetto
Champions (1): 1978–79
Runner Up (–): —
Coppa Italia
Champions (1): 1996-97
Runner Up (1): 2012-13
Super Coppa
Runner Up (–): —
Torneo di Viareggio Cup
Champions (1): 1975
Runner Up (4): 1969, 1984, 1990, 1991

Allievi Nazionali Serie A & B (U17) - Allievi Professionisti (competes against Serie A and B clubs)

Allievi Nazionali Staff
Head coach: Massimo Carnevale
Assistant coach: Antonio Vanacore
Physical Trainer: Arcangelo Crispino
Goalkeeping coach: Massimiliano Di Gliulo
Team Leader: Luca Lentini

Allievi Lega Pro I & II (U17) - Allievi Lega Pro (competes against Lega Pro clubs)

Allievi Lega Pro Staff
Head coach: Vincenzo Marino
Assistant coach: Armando Nocerino
Physical Trainer: Giuseppe Trepiccione
Goalkeeping coach: Massimiliano Di Gliulo

Notable former Youth Team players
Below is a list of some footballers who have played for the Napoli youth squads:

Senior internationals
Italy

 Fabio Cannavaro
 Lorenzo Insigne
 Fabio Liverani
 Antonio Juliano
 Francesco Baiano
 Ciro Ferrara
 Attila Sallustro

Estonia

 Frank Liivak

See also
Campionato Nazionale Primavera
Coppa Italia Primavera
Supercoppa Primavera
 Youth system
 Reserve team
 Youth Sector (cantera)

References

Football academies in Italy
S.S.C. Napoli
UEFA Youth League teams